Streptomyces gossypiisoli is a bacterium species from the genus of Streptomyces which has been isolated from cotton soil from Xinjiang in China.

See also 
 List of Streptomyces species

References 

gossypiisoli
Bacteria described in 2020